Lofterød is a Norwegian surname. Notable people with the surname include:

Bjørn Lofterød (born 1949), Norwegian sailor
Odd Roar Lofterød (1947–2012), Norwegian sailor

Norwegian-language surnames